Keezhoote Balakrishna Pillai Ganesh Kumar (born 25 May 1966) is an Indian actor, television host, and politician. Ganesh Kumar is a proposed cabinet minister for the last 2.5 years in the ongoing 2nd LDF govt in Kerala and he is also the current MLA of KC(B) representing the Pathanapuram constituency in Kollam, Kerala. He made his debut as an actor in the film Irakal (1985) directed by K. G. George. He has starred in over 100 Malayalam films, performing a variety of roles.

He was the Minister for Forests & Environment, Sports and Cinema in the Government of Kerala beginning May 2011 until his resignation on 1 April 2013. He was elected from Pathanapuram in 2001 and has represented the constituency ever since. He was Transport Minister from May 2001 to March 2003. He is the son of R. Balakrishna Pillai, former Minister of Kerala.

Political career 

In May 2001, Ganesh Kumar was elected to the Kerala Assembly from Pathanapuram on a Kerala Congress (B) ticket. He defeated his opponent, K. Prekash Babu, by a margin of 9,931 votes. Ganesh Kumar's father and former Minister, R. Balakrishna Pillai had also been elected from the neighbouring constituency of Kottarakara, which he had represented for several decades.

Ganesh Kumar became Transport Minister in the A. K. Antony cabinet in May 2001 and went on to give a good account of himself. Though a political novice at that time, he turned around the ailing KSRTC (Kerala State Road Transport Corporation) and earned a reputation for providing a clean and efficient administration. In March 2003, he stepped down from his ministerial post to facilitate his father's induction into the Cabinet.

In the 2006 Assembly elections, Ganesh Kumar was once again elected from Pathanapuram, this time realising an increased victory margin of 11,814 votes by defeating K. R. Chandramohanan of CPI. LDF had made a clean sweep, winning 11 out of 12 seats in Kollam District and a formidable majority in the State Assembly, thereby making Ganesh Kumar the only UDF MLA from Kollam district. The election also saw the defeat of many of his former ministerial colleagues, including M. K. Muneer, P. K. Kunhalikutty, Babu Divakaran and Ganesh Kumar's father Balakrishna Pillai.

In the 2011 Assembly elections, Ganesh Kumar scored a hat-trick win from Pathanapuram with an even bigger margin of 20,402 votes, trouncing his veteran CPM rival, K. Rajagopal. He went on to become a Minister for Forests, Sports and Cinema in the Oommen Chandy cabinet in May 2011. He resigned from cabinet due to the domestic violence case filed by his wife Yamini Thankachi on 7 April 2013. In the 2016 Assembly elections, Ganesh Kumar become an LDF candidate and defeated Jagadish of Indian National Congress by a margin of 24,562 votes.

Personal life

Ganesh was born in a Hindu Nair family as the son of former minister R. Balakrishna Pillai and Valsala Kumari in Thiruvananthapuram, Kerala on 25 May 1966. He was a alumnus of Government Arts College, Thiruvananthapuram.

He was married to Dr. Yamini Thankachy on 20 May 1994. Yamini works as a senior research fellow at the Achutha Menon Centre for Health Science Studies and was pursuing her Ph.D in Adolescent health. The couple have two sons, Adithyan and Devaraman. The couple later divorced due to irreconcilable differences. Ganesh married Bindhu Menon on 24 January 2014 who works as marketing head in Asianet.

Film career 

Ganesh Kumar made his debut in the 1985 Malayalam film Irakal directed by K. G. George. The film was adjudged the second best film for the year. Over the years he made his a mark on the silver screen as a supporting actor, performing a variety of roles during the last two decades. Since 2001 he has balanced his role as MLA with his acting duties.

Ganesh Kumar's early films saw him frequently donning the role of villain or anti-social, as portrayed in Cheppu (1987) and Rakuyilin Ragasadassil. The film Lion (2005), starring Dileep and Kavya Madhavan was loosely based on Ganesh Kumar's life. The movie fared well at the box office.

In March 2008, Ganesh Kumar was chosen by the Frame Media Gallup poll to receive the best actor award for his role in the Amrita TV serial Aliyanmarum Penganmarum. He went on to win the State Award for Best Television Actor (2007) for his role in the serial Madhavam, aired on Surya TV.

Controversy 
Fenny Balakrishnan, the former lawyer and counsel for Saritha S Nair, the prime accused in the 2013 solar scam, had raised serious allegations against Ganesh Kumar, saying that Ganesh Kumar added four pages to Saritha S. Nair's letter, bringing the total number of pages to 25.

In 2018, he allegedly assaulted a youth in a road rage incident, with the youth ending up in a hospital for injury treatment. Later that year he allegedly manhandled a school headmaster in a school event, facing charges.

Filmography

Christopher (2023)
Monster (2022) as SP Joseph Cherian IPS
Aaraattu (2022) as SP Joseph Cherian
Marakkar: Arabikadalinte Simham (2021) as Verkkottu Panicker
Drishyam 2 (2021) as CI Philip Mathew
Saajan Bakery Since 1962 (2021) as Cheriyan
Mera Naam Shaji (2019) as Dominic George
Kodathi Samaksham Balan Vakeel (2019) as Vincent Thomas
 Mandharam  (2018) as Rajesh's Father
 Hallelooya (2016) as Father FrancisVillali Veeran (2014) as Pavithran Mizhi Thurakku (2014) as shuhaib SRP Avatharam (2014) Ladies and Gentleman (2013) Up & Down: Mukalil Oralundu (2013) as Siyad Ahemmed Spirit (2012) My Boss (2012) Sandwich (2011) Priyappetta Nattukare (2011) as G K Nakharam (2011) Four Friends (2010) Kaaryasthan (2010)Alexander the Great (2010) Janakan (2010)Ivar Vivahitharayal (2009) Red Chillies (2009)Swa Le (2009) as VishnuVellathooval (2009)Rahasya Police (2009) as Parampathu RajuKadha, Samvidhanam Kunchakko (2009) as SP Manoj Pothan Keralotsavam (2009) Sagar Alias Jacky Reloaded (2009)Veruthe Oru Bharya (2008) as DoctorAli Bhai(2007) as Therandi RamuHallo (2007) as Sudheesh NambiarPhotographer (2006)Vismayathumbathu (2004) as Medical college ProfessorKilichundan Mampazham (2003) as UmmarPilots (2000) as VinayachandranDada Sahib (2000) as Das Susanna(2000) as Johny Olympian Antony Adam (1999) as ASP Nasser IPSAayiram Meni (1999) as Lalichan (Actress Urvasi)Crime File (1999) as Raju NamasivayaF.I.R (1999) as Roy AlexUstaad (1999) as SethuThe Truth (1998) as Sit Team MemberVarnapakittu (1997) as TonichenAaram Thamburan (1997) as Ashok KumarGuru (1997)Kalyanappittannu (1997)Asuravamsam (1997) as Dr MohanAayiram Naavulla Ananthan (1996) as RajuMahatma The great (1996)Samoohyapadom (1996)The King (1995) as PrasadAgrajan (1995)Paavam I.A.Iwachan (1994) as Kozhinjampara LolanVishnu (1994) as ChandramohanRudraksham (1994) as Surendra ReddyCommisioner (1994) as PrasadNandini Oppol (1994) (Actress Sunitha)Pakshe (1994)Gamanam(1994) as BhasiEkalavyan (1993) as Unni Joseph MulaveedanSthalathe Pradhana Payyans (1993) as PrasannanManichithrathazhu (1993) as Dasappan KuttyCustoms Diary (1993) as JamalJanam (1993) as MaheshMafia (1993) as MurukanAmmayane Sathyam (1993) as CherianMahanagaram (1992) as RajuNeelakurukkan (1992) as Nassar Kizhakkan Pathrose (1992)Ootty Pattanam (1992) as Rama VarmaKasargod Khader Bhai (1992)Kaazhchakkppuram (1992) as VijayanManyanmaar (1992)Ardram (1992) as AbduNayam Vyakthamakkunnu (1991) as JournalistKilukkam (1991) as Justice Pillai's sonApoorvam Chilar (1991) as BennyKuttapathram (1991) as PeterNjan Gandharvan (1991) as PradeepKaakka Thollayiram (1991) as (Actress Urvasi)Abhimanyu (1991)Parallel College (1991) as VikramanPonnaranjanam (1990) as GilbertKottayam Kunjachan (1990) as MathanMaala Yogam (1990) as GeorgekuttyVeena Meettiya Vilangukal (1990)Aye Auto (1990) as SureshGajakesariyogam (1990) as Vasu (Actress Sunitha)Randam Varavu (1990) as TomyEenam Thettatha Kattaru (1989) as RajeshNair Saab (1989) as Cadet GaneshanJagratha (1989) as KumarAdharvam (1989) as Vishnu (Actress Parvathy)Vandanam (1989) as RaghuDevadas (1989) as Rajashekharan ThampiPuthiya Karukkal (1989) as SureshManasa Maine Varu (1988) as RajuMukthi (1988) as VinodSangham (1988) as AnilMrithyunjayam (1988) as RobinDhinarathrangal (1988)Janmandharam (1988) as MuraliChithram (1988) as Lissie's BrotherOru Muthassi Katha (1988) as UnnikrishnanKakkothikkavile Appooppan Thaadikal (1988)Oru Vivada Vishayam (1987) as UnniSarvakalashala (1987) as PancharaBhoomiyile Rajakkanmar (1987) as RajuKadhakku Pinnil (1987) as MohananCheppu (1987) as RanjithYuvajanotsavam (1986) as RajeevanSukhamo Devi (1986) as Chandran, Devi's brotherIrakal (1985) as Baby Television 

 Ammayi (Doordarshan)Dr. Harischadra (Doordarshan)Samayam (Asianet)Gandharva Yamam  (Asianet)Sindhooram (Asianet)Radhamadhavam (Surya TV)Mohangal (Doordarshan)Oru Kudayum Kunjipengalum (Doordarshan)Melappadam (Doordarshan)Jwalayayi (Doordarshan)Madhavam (Surya TV)Megham (Asianet)Vikramadithyan (Asianet)Ammathottil(Asianet)Aliyanmarum Penganmarum (Amrita TV)Mandaram(Kairali TV)Bhamini Tholkkarilla (Asianet)Jagratha (Amrita TV)Kalyani (Mazhavil Manorama) TV shows as Host Nammal Thammil (Asianet)Awards

 Kerala State Television Awards 
2007 : Kerala State Television Award for Best Actor in a Lead role - Male - Madhavam''

References

External links

Living people
Malayali politicians
Kerala politicians
Male actors from Thiruvananthapuram
Politicians from Thiruvananthapuram
1966 births
Indian actor-politicians
Male actors in Malayalam cinema
Indian male film actors
Kerala Congress (B) politicians
Kerala MLAs 2006–2011
Kerala MLAs 2001–2006
Kerala MLAs 2011–2016
Kerala MLAs 2016–2021
20th-century Indian male actors
21st-century Indian male actors
Indian male television actors
Male actors in Hindi television
Male actors in Malayalam television